The Turner Stadium, officially the Yaakov Turner Toto Stadium Be'er Sheva, is a football stadium in Be'er Sheva, Israel. It is the home ground of Hapoel Be'er Sheva. It was named after former Be'er Sheva mayor Yaakov Turner. The stadium also serves the Israel national football team for some home matches.

History
The stadium has an all-seated capacity of 16,126 seats, with the southern stand named after Arthur Vasermil, for whom the club's previous Vasermil Stadium was named. and is a part of a sports complex that also includes the multi-purpose 3,000-seat Conch Arena, a training field and a swimming pool.

The stadium, located on the northern side of Be'er Sheva,  opened during the early stages of the 2015–16 season, with the club selling a record 12,000 season tickets. However, as it was not ready for the start of the season, Hapoel were forced to play their first home match at the Teddy Stadium in Jerusalem. The first match at the ground was played on 21 September 2015, a 0–0 draw with Maccabi Haifa.

The first match of the Israel national football team was played on October 14, 2018. Israel hosted the Albania national football team in the 2018–19 UEFA Nations League match and won the match by a score of 2–0.

On 2 August 2020, the stadium was declared a dangerous building by the Beersheba municipality due to structural problems and was closed. On 3 August 2020 it was revealed that the structural problems included cracks in the support beams and loose bolts. The municipality announced it would sue the constructing company and said they would remove the stadium roof.

International matches

See also
Sports in Israel

References

External links
Official website

Football venues in Israel
Sports venues in Beersheba
Hapoel Be'er Sheva F.C.
Sports venues completed in 2015
2015 establishments in Israel